L'Astragale may refer to:
 L'Astragale, a  semi-autobiographical novel by Albertine Sarrazin
 L'Astragale (1968 film), a French film, inspired by the novel
 L'Astragale (2015 film), a French drama film, an adaptation of the novel